Gumani River is a river in Bangladesh. It originates from the river Padma and meets with the Barani near Morkal Bazar. The joint flow of Gurnai and Baranai flows southeast as the Gurnai and meets with the Gurudaspur near Chanchkoir, Gurudaspur Upazila to the east of the Cholon Bil and flows as the Gumani. Flowing east of Bhangura the river again meets with the Boral and flows further as the Boral (Atrai-Baral).

References

Rivers of Bangladesh
Rivers of Rajshahi Division